WFFF-FM (96.7 FM) is a radio station broadcasting a classic hits format. Licensed to Columbia, Mississippi, United States, the station is owned by Haddox Enterprises, Inc. and features programming from Westwood One and USA Radio Network.

History
The station was assigned the call sign WFFF-FM on November 7, 1966, and was first licensed on June 1, 1967.

References

External links

FFF-FM
Columbia, Mississippi
Radio stations established in 1966
1966 establishments in Mississippi
Classic hits radio stations in the United States